Massimo Gadda (born 16 September 1963) is an Italian professional football coach and a former player. He is the manager of Ravenna in Serie D.

Playing career
He played for 2 seasons (21 games, no goals) in the Serie A for Milan and Ancona.

Coaching career
During his time as an assistant manager with Cesena, he formally served as a bench boss for a period of time due to disqualification of the real manager, Fabrizio Castori.

On 25 October 2021, he returned to Forlì. He was however sacked on 27 January 2022.

On 7 November 2022, Gadda was hired as head coach of Ravenna for a third time in his career.

Honours
 Mitropa Cup winner: 1981–82.

References

External links
Massimo Gadda at Soccerway

1963 births
Living people
People from Legnano
Italian footballers
Association football midfielders
Footballers from Lombardy
Serie A players
Serie B players
Serie C players
A.C. Milan players
A.C. Reggiana 1919 players
U.S. Livorno 1915 players
A.C. Ancona players
Ravenna F.C. players
A.C. Cesena players
S.P.A.L. players
Alma Juventus Fano 1906 players
Italian football managers
A.C. Bellaria Igea Marina managers
Ravenna F.C. managers
Alma Juventus Fano 1906 managers
S.P.A.L. managers
Imolese Calcio 1919 managers
Serie C managers
Serie D managers
Sportspeople from the Metropolitan City of Milan